The Dyfi Bridge, also known as the Machynlleth Bridge, Dovey Bridge, Pont Dyfi or Pont ar Dyfi, is a road bridge carrying the A487 road across the River Dyfi north of Machynlleth, Powys, Wales. It is described as "one of the finest bridges in Montgomeryshire" by the Gwynedd Archaeological Trust.

History and description
The bridge was initially a timber bridge, built in 1533 using £6 13s 4d (10 marks) given by London merchant Geoffry Hughes. It was rebuilt in stone in 1681 and rebuilt again in 1805. The bridge is a scheduled monument and received a Grade II* heritage listing in 1952.

The present day bridge carries the A487 road across the River Dyfi between Machynlleth (Montgomeryshire/Powys) and the Corris community (Merionethshire/Gwynedd). At 5.5 metres in width and 64 metres in length, the bridge has five arches, with the two arches at the Machynlleth end reinforced with modern steelwork.

New bridge
In 2011 a report was drawn up recommending the bridge was replaced or widened because of its strategic importance, as it had unsafe low parapets and a lack of footways, and had been repeatedly damaged by motor vehicles because of its poor sightlines. The recommendations were dismissed in favour of looking at options for a new bridge at a different location.

On 19 May 2017 the Welsh government published a statement that a new bridge would be constructed about 500 m upstream from the current bridge. Work was scheduled to start near the end of 2018 and the completion of the bridge (being ready for traffic) was envisaged in the summer of 2020. The start date was subsequently delayed till at least 2019, with a public enquiry possibly required depending on the results of consultation. On 13 January 2020 the Welsh government announced that there would be no public enquiry, and construction would start in the summer of 2020 with estimated completion in summer 2022. Construction started in Spring 2021 and the new bridge is due to be opened in Summer 2023.

References

Bridges completed in 1805
Grade II* listed bridges in Wales
Grade II* listed buildings in Powys
Machynlleth
Corris
Dyfi
Dyfi